Glorious Youth is a 1929 British silent drama film directed by Graham Cutts and starring Anny Ondra, Randle Ayrton and William Freshman. It is also known by the alternative title of Eileen of the Trees. It was one of two films Cutts made with the Czech actress Anny Ondra. The film is based on the novel Eileen of the Trees by Henry De Vere Stacpoole and was made at Elstree Studios.

Cast
 Anny Ondra - Eileen
 William Freshman
 Randle Ayrton
 Gibb McLaughlin
 A. Bromley Davenport
 Forrester Harvey
 Arthur Roberts
 Jerrold Robertshaw

References

Bibliography
 Low, Rachel. The History of British Film: Volume IV, 1918–1929. Routledge, 1997.

External links

1929 films
British drama films
British silent feature films
1929 drama films
Films directed by Graham Cutts
Films based on Irish novels
Films based on works by Henry De Vere Stacpoole
Films shot at British International Pictures Studios
Films set in England
British black-and-white films
1920s English-language films
1920s British films
Silent drama films